In chromatin, those proteins which remain after the histones have been removed, are classified as non-histone proteins.  The non-histone proteins, are a large group of heterogeneous proteins that play a role in organization and compaction of the chromosome into higher order structures. They play vital roles in regulating processes like nucleosome remodeling, DNA replication, RNA synthesis and processing, nuclear transport, steroid hormone action and interphase/mitosis transition.
Scaffold proteins, DNA polymerase, Heterochromatin Protein 1 and Polycomb are common non-histone proteins.  This classification group also includes numerous other structural, regulatory, and motor proteins. Non-histone protein are acidic.

See also
 Chromatin
 Cohesin
 Condensin

References

Sources

Epigenetics